Kiçik Düzyürd (also, Kechik-Dyzyrt and Kichik Dyuzyurd) is a village in the Gadabay Rayon of Azerbaijan.

References 

Populated places in Gadabay District